Dennis John Maruk (born November 17, 1955) is a Canadian former professional ice hockey player of Ukrainian descent. He played in the National Hockey League (NHL) from 1975 to 1989, scoring a career-high 60 goals for the Washington Capitals in 1981–82.

Career
As a youth, Maruk played in the 1968 Quebec International Pee-Wee Hockey Tournament with a minor ice hockey team from Etobicoke.

Maruk played junior "A" hockey in the Ontario Hockey League for the London Knights before he was drafted in 1975 by the California Golden Seals. While with the Seals, he became the first NHL rookie to score five shorthanded goals in a season. Maruk followed the franchise when it relocated to Cleveland to become the Cleveland Barons a year later.

Maruk's rights were later obtained by the Minnesota North Stars after the Barons merged with them in 1978, but he was traded shortly afterwards to the Washington Capitals. During his time with the Capitals, he scored 50 goals in 1980-81 and 60 goals in 1981-82; his mark of 76 assists and 136 points in the 1982 season remain Capitals' records for a single-season. Maruk was the first Capitals player to score 100 points in a season.

In 1982-83, Maruk was one of the players instrumental in leading the Capitals to their first playoff appearance. Despite this, he was traded back to the North Stars where he would finish his career. At the time of his retirement in 1989, he was the last active NHL player to have played for the Seals/Barons franchise, although Charlie Simmer played later than him in minor leagues. Maruk was also the last Minnesota North Stars player to wear the number 9 prior to Mike Modano.

In 888 NHL games, he scored 356 goals and had 522 assists.

Career statistics

Regular season and playoffs

International

References

External links
 Profile at hockeydraftcentral.com
 

1955 births
California Golden Seals draft picks
California Golden Seals players
Canadian ice hockey centres
Canadian people of Ukrainian descent
Cleveland Barons (NHL) players
Cleveland Crusaders draft picks
Ice hockey people from Toronto
Kalamazoo Wings (1974–2000) players
Lake Charles Ice Pirates players
Living people
London Knights players
Minnesota Blue Ox players
Minnesota North Stars players
Oakland Seals players
Toronto Marlboros players
Washington Capitals players